Boston Teran is the pseudonymous American author of sixteen novels.

Works
God Is a Bullet (1999)
Never Count Out the Dead (2001)
The Prince of Deadly Weapons (2002)
Trois Femmes (2006)  
Giv: The Story of a Dog and America (2009)
The Creed of Violence (2010)
Gardens of Grief (2011)
The World Eve Left Us (2012)
The Cloud and the Fire (2013)
The Country I Lived In (2013)
By Your Deeds (2016)
 A Child Went Forth (2018)
 How Beautiful They Were (2019) 
 Two Boys at Breakwater (July 2021)
 Crippled Jack (September 2022)
 Big Island L.A. (October 2023)

Awards and distinctions
Winner, 2000 CWA John Creasey Award for best first novel: God is a Bullet
Finalist, 2000 Mystery Writers of America Edgar Award for Best First Novel: God is a Bullet
Longlist, 2001 International Dublin Literary Award: God is a Bullet
Winner, 2001 Japan Adventure Fiction Association Prize: God is a Bullet
Longlist, 2011 International Dublin Literary Award: Giv: The Story of a Dog and America
Finalist, 2011 ForeWord INDIES for Adult Fiction (Historical): Gardens of Grief
Silver Winner, 2012 ForeWord INDIES for Adult Fiction (Translations): The World Eve Left Us
Finalist, 2018 Foreword INDIES for Adult Fiction (Historical): A Child Went Forth
Historical Fiction in the 2019 International Book Awards “A Child Went Forth”
 Finalist for Historical Fiction in the 2019 ForeWord Reviews “Book of the Year” Awards “A Child Went Forth”
 Silver for Historical Fiction in the 2019 Independent Publishers Awards “A Child Went Forth”
Winner in the “Adventure: Historical” category at the 2019 American Fiction Awards “A Child Went Forth”
Finalist, 2022 Eric Hoffer Award. Montaigne Medal Finalist: Two Boys At Breakwater
Silver in the 34th annual IBPA Benjamin Franklin Award™ program in the following category: LGBTQ+ "Two Boys At Breakwater"

References

External links
 Official website

20th-century American novelists
American mystery writers
Living people
Year of birth missing (living people)